Renče is a settlement in the lower Vipava Valley in the Municipality of Renče–Vogrsko in the Littoral region of Slovenia.

The hamlets of Arčoni, Lukežiči, Martinuči, Mohorini, Merljaki (Mrljaki until 1993), Renški Podkraj, and Žigoni were independent settlements until 2000, when they were incorporated into Renče.

The parish church in the settlement is dedicated to Saints Hermagoras and Fortunatus and belongs to the Diocese of Koper.

References

External links
Renče on Geopedia

Populated places in the Municipality of Renče-Vogrsko